Zhuravka is a rural locality (a selo) and the administrative center of Zhuravskoye Rural Settlement, Yelansky District, Volgograd Oblast, Russia. The population was 788 as of 2010. There are 5 streets.

Geography 
Zhuravka is located on Khopyorsko-Buzulukskaya Plain, 30 km southeast of Yelan (the district's administrative centre) by road. Tersa is the nearest rural locality.

References 

Rural localities in Yelansky District